George Lane Parker (1724–1791) was a British Army officer and politician who sat in the House of Commons between 1769 and 1780.

Early life
Parker was born on 6 September 1724, the second son of George Parker, 2nd Earl of Macclesfield and his first wife Mary Lane, daughter of Ralph Lane of Woodbury. He matriculated at Hertford College, Oxford on 20 January 1741 and graduated BA in 1743 and MA in 1750.

Military career
Parker joined the army in the 1st Foot Guards and was lieutenant and captain in 1749 and captain and lieutenant-colonel in 1755. He became Colonel in 1762 and Major-general in 1770. From 1773 to 1782 he was Colonel of the 20th Foot. He became a Lieutenant-General in 1777 and was Colonel of the 12th Dragoons from 1782.

Political career
In the 1768 general election he stood for Yarmouth (Isle of Wight) on the Holmes-Stanley interest and was returned as Member of Parliament on petition on 19 January 1769. He was returned at Tregony  as a Government candidate in the  1774 general election. He had a poor attendance record, probably because of his military duties. He voted with the Government and is not recorded as speaking in the House.

Later life
Parker married Jane Lady Dormer, widow of Sir Charles Cottrell-Dormer (son of Clement Cottrell-Dormer) and daughter of Charles Adelmare Caesar in May 1782. He died on 6 September 1791.

References

External links
Attribution

1724 births
1791 deaths
Alumni of Hertford College, Oxford
British Army generals
Members of the Parliament of Great Britain for constituencies in Cornwall
British MPs 1768–1774
British MPs 1774–1780
Members of Parliament for the Isle of Wight
Grenadier Guards officers
Lancashire Fusiliers officers
12th Royal Lancers officers
Younger sons of earls